The musical Hadestown, written by American singer-songwriter Anaïs Mitchell and based on her 2010 studio album of the same name, has had two official cast recordings. In addition, various songs from Hadestown were re-recorded by Mitchell for her 2014 studio album Xoa, including the musical's opening number "Anyway the Wind Blows" which had not appeared on the original concept album. The song "Why We Build the Wall" has been covered by a variety of artists, including English singer-songwriter Billy Bragg for his 2017 EP Bridges Not Walls, Ben Fisher, Ben Dunham, Lilli Lewis, and Robert Neustadt.

Live Original Cast Recording

Hadestown: The Myth. The Musical. (Live Original Cast Recording) is the cast album of the 2016 Off-Broadway production at New York Theatre Workshop. It was released digitally and on CD on October 6, 2017 through Ghostlight Records and Parlophone Records. A four-track EP containing live recordings of "Way Down Hadestown," "All I've Ever Known," "Wait For Me," and "Why We Build the Wall" entitled Why We Build The Wall (Selections from Hadestown. The Myth. The Musical. Live Original Cast Recording) was released for digital retailers on October 13, 2016 in promotion of the album. The live album was recorded from the June 28 and 29, 2016 performances. The recording does not contain every song from the production. It debuted at number 3 on the Billboard Cast Albums chart.

Track listing

Original Broadway Cast Recording

Hadestown (Original Broadway Cast Recording) is the official recording of the Broadway production of Hadestown. It was originally announced to be released on June 7, 2019 on all major digital and streaming platforms, but on May 31 it was revealed that due to delays in production only a selection of music would be released on that date, with the rest of the cast album released in "character drops" over the course of the next few weeks, with the full album available on July 26. A compact disc and vinyl release followed on November 1 and November 29, 2019 respectively. Unlike the original live recording, the Broadway cast recording contains the complete score. The 40-track recording won Best Musical Theater Album at the 62nd Annual Grammy Awards.

Promotion
The first drop on June 7, 2019 contained the songs "Livin' It Up on Top," "When the Chips are Down Intro," "When the Chips are Down," "Gone, I'm Gone," "Wait For Me Intro," "Wait For Me," "Why We Build the Wall," "Why We Build the Wall Outro," "Our Lady of the Underground," "Flowers," and "Road to Hell (Reprise)." The second drop, themed around Hades and Persephone, was released on June 28 and featured "Way Down Hadestown," "Hey, Little Songbird," "Papers Intro," "Papers Instrumental," "How Long?," "Chant (Reprise)," and "We Raise Our Cups." The third drop on July 12 was themed around Hermes, The Fates, and the Workers' Chorus and featured "Road to Hell," "Chant," "A Gathering Storm," "Way Down Hadestown (Reprise)," "Nothing Changes," "Word to the Wise," "Wait for Me (Reprise) Intro," and "Wait For Me (Reprise)." The final character drop on July 26 was themed around Orpheus and Eurydice and contained the remaining songs from the cast album.

Track listing

Charts

Year-end charts

If the Fates Allow: A Hadestown Holiday Album

If the Fates Allow: A Hadestown Holiday Album is a Christmas album by the Original Broadway Cast of Hadestown that was released on November 20, 2020 through Broadway Records. Principal vocals were provided by Yvette Gonzalez-Nacer, Kay Trinidad, and Jewelle Blackman, with additional appearances from the rest of the cast. The album features "beloved holiday classics as well as songs composed by Gonzalez-Nacer, Hadestown’s Tony-winning songwriter Anaïs Mitchell, and Hadestown music director Liam Robinson".

Track listing
All songs performed by Jewelle Blackman, Yvette Gonzalez-Nacer, and Kay Trinidad.

References

Cast recordings
Theatre soundtracks
2017 soundtrack albums
2019 soundtrack albums
Parlophone soundtracks
Folk jazz albums
Folk soundtracks
Jazz soundtracks
Grammy Award for Best Musical Theater Album
Grammy Award-winning albums